Digital sequence information (DSI) is a placeholder term used in international policy fora, particularly the Convention on Biological Diversity (CBD), to refer to data derived from de-materialized genetic resources. The 2018 Ad Hoc Technical Expert Group on DSI reached consensus that the term was "not appropriate". Nevertheless, the term is generally agreed to include nucleic acid sequence data, and may be construed to include other data types derived from or linked to dematerialized genetic resources, including, for example, protein sequence data. The appropriateness and meaning of this term remain controversial as evidenced by its continued placeholder status, post the 15th Conference of the Parties to the CBD. DSI is crucial to research in a wide range of contexts, including public health, medicine, biodiversity, plant and animal breeding, and evolution research.

The Nagoya Protocol, a component of the Convention on Biological Diversity, establishes a right for countries to regulate, and to share in benefits derived from, their nation's genetic resources by arranging Access and Benefit Sharing Agreements with users. Academic researchers, however, generally share DSI freely and openly online, following a set of principles that align with the open science movement. Open sharing of DSI is recognized to have broad benefits, and open science is a major and growing focus of international science policy. This creates a perceived conflict with benefit sharing obligations, as individuals can access and use these open data without entering into benefit-sharing agreements. Parties to the Convention on Biological Diversity are currently considering a range of policy options that strike different balances between these two important international policy goals.

DSI is also an important concept in other international legally binding instruments with access and benefit-sharing obligations, including the International Treaty on Plant Genetic Resources for Food and Agriculture, the Pandemic Influenza Preparedness Framework, the Antarctic Treaty System and the Biodiversity Beyond National Jurisdiction negotiations, a component of the United Nations Convention on the Law of the Sea.

References 

Convention on Biological Diversity
Genetics software
Genetics studies